Toby Ann Stavisky (née Goldhaar, born June 26, 1939) is an American politician serving as a member of the New York State Senate, having held a seat since 1999. She represents the 11th district, which comprises parts of Queens.

Life and career 
Stavisky was born and raised on the Upper West Side of Manhattan. She attended New York City public schools before graduating from Bronx High School of Science, and Syracuse University, which she attended on an academic scholarship. The Senator completed graduate courses at Hunter College and Queens College.

After working in the actuarial department of a major insurance company, Stavisky taught Social Studies in the New York City high schools. She served as District Manager in Northeast Queens for the Census, where she directed more than 1,000 field and office staff and was cited by the Commerce Department for her outstanding work.

Stavisky was married to Dr. Leonard P. Stavisky (1925–1999), a member of the New York State Assembly from 1966 to 1983, and of the New York State Senate from 1983 until his death in 1999. Her son, Evan M. Stavisky, is a political consultant as well as a local district leader.

New York Senate 
Upon the death of her husband in 1999, Stavisky ran and easily won the special election to succeed him. She is the first woman from Queens County elected to the State Senate. When she first won election, the district was predominantly Jewish, but has shifted drastically over the past two decades to become majority Asian American. As such, Stavisky has faced primaries in recent years against Asian-American candidates, but has been successful in each challenge.

From 2003 to 2008, Stavisky served as Assistant Minority Whip and Ranking Minority Member of the Committee on Higher Education. She currently serves as the Chairwoman of the Committee on Higher Education. In 2013, Stavisky was appointed to the subcommittee on New York City Education.

In 2022, Stavisky sponsored a bill that would give state health insurance coverage to unauthorized immigrants.

Stavisky has claimed that New York's bail reform laws have had no clear impact on the increase in crime.

In 2023, Stavisky's Senate district changed from the 16th to the 11th.

References

External links
 New York State Senate: Toby Ann Stavisky

Living people
Democratic Party New York (state) state senators
People from Whitestone, Queens
Women state legislators in New York (state)
Syracuse University alumni
Hunter College alumni
21st-century American politicians
21st-century American women politicians
People from the Upper West Side
The Bronx High School of Science alumni
20th-century American politicians
20th-century American women politicians
1939 births